was a  Japanese historian specialising in the Renaissance. He was active as a conservative thinker, commentator and major exponent of the Nihonjinron. He was born in Kyōto on 5 March 1916. He graduated from Kyoto University in 1940 and had his master's degree in history interrupted in 1943, when he was drafted into the Imperial Japanese Army. He participated in the Burma campaign of 1944 as an infantryman. He surrendered to the British Army at the war's end and was detained at a prisoner-of-war camp in the British colony of Burma. His experiences in the camp are described in his best-selling memoir, Aaron Shūyōjo (1962). Upon his repatriation in 1947, he began to teach at Kobe University. He was appointed full professor at Kyoto University's Humanities Department in 1952. He retired from the University in 1979, when he became an emeritus professor. He died of pneumonia on 17 September 1997.

Theory of European Rationalism 

Aida is best remembered for the theory that the "rationality" of Western civilization was consequential upon the practice of raising and killing livestock. He associated the slaughter of domestic animals, which had been hitherto reared with great care, with the nonchalant belligerence of Western soldiers. In his view, Westerners are free from the kind of hysteria Japanese soldiers would often show at the sight of bloodshed. Aida blamed this hysteria for the excessive acts of cruelty that the Japanese were accused of during the Second World War. Westerners, on the other hand, have so long been accustomed to calmly butchering animals that they developed a rational approach to slaughter, which they extended to human conflict. The Japanese hardly had any contact with livestock owing to the Buddhist taboo of eating meat and were too emotive to master the Western sort of nonchalance.

Works
 Kyōdai Seiyōshi: 4, Sōgensha, Tokyo 1951
 Runesansu, Kawade Shobō, Tokyo 1974
 Aaron Shūyōjo Chūō Kōronsha, Tokyo 1962
 Gōrishugi Kōdansha Gendai Shinsho, Tokyo 1966
 Mikeranjiero:Ai to Bi to Shi to Seibundō Shinkōsha, 1963
 Haisha no jōken: Sengoku jidai o kangaeru, Chūō Kōronsha, Tokyo 1965
 Nihonjin no ishiki kôzô, Kôdansha Gendai Shinsho, Tokyo 1972
 Ketsudan no jōken, Shichōsha, 1975
 Chōetsusha no shisō: kami to hito no deai, Kōdansha, Tokyo 1975
 Runesansu no bijutsu to shakai, Sōgensha, Tokyo 1981
 Mikeranjiero: Sono kodoku to Eikō, PHP, Kyoto 1996
 Rekishika no tachiba PHP, Kyoto 1997

References 

Imperial Japanese Army personnel of World War II
People from Kyoto
Academic staff of Kobe University
Academic staff of Kyoto University
Kyoto University alumni
1916 births
1997 deaths
Deaths from pneumonia in Japan
20th-century Japanese historians
Japanese prisoners of war
World War II prisoners of war held by the United Kingdom
Imperial Japanese Army soldiers